Oberst Glacier is a glacier draining the west side of Balchen Mountain in the Sor Rondane Mountains. Mapped by Norwegian cartographers in 1957 from air photos taken by U.S. Navy Operation Highjump, 1946–47, and named Oberstbreen (the colonel glacier) because of its association with Balchen Mountain. Bernt Balchen, a famous Norwegian polar aviator, achieved the rank of colonel in the U.S. Army Air Force in World War II.

See also
 List of glaciers in the Antarctic
 Glaciology

References
 

Glaciers of Queen Maud Land
Princess Ragnhild Coast